Wang Luodan is a Chinese actress and singer. She rose to fame because with the TV series Struggle (2007). She became increasingly popular after starring in My Youthfulness (2009) and A Story of Lala's Promotion (2010). Wang has also established herself in films  Driverless (2010), Caught in the Web (2012) and The Dead End (2015). Due to her popularity, she was named one of the new New Four Dan Actresses in 2009. In 2013, she won Golden Rooster Award for Best Supporting Actress for her performance in the film Caught in the Web. Li ranked 74th on Forbes China Celebrity 100 list in 2014.

Early life and education
Wang was born in Inner Mongolia, China. She graduated from Beijing Film Academy in 2005.

Career
Wang rose to fame for her role in the highly popular youth drama, Struggle (2007), playing a girl from a wealthy family who is always optimistic in her never ending pursuit of love. She cemented her straightforward onscreen persona in My Youthfulness (2009), the second installment of Zhao Baogang's 'Youth' trilogy after Struggle.

After achieving success on the small screen, Wang ventured to films. She starred in the experimental indie film Twilight Dancing (2008) directed by Shu Ya.

Wang resumed her onscreen persona in the youth-oriented drama, Go La La Go! (2010) based on the novel of A Story of Lala's Promotion. The series attracted a large following among younger viewers and many of their middle-aged parents. The same year, Wang starred in the film Driverless. Opposite from her usual spunky roles, she plays a deaf-mute girl who is crazily in love with an amateur car racer and was praised by critics for her performance. Due to her popularity, she was named one of the new Four Dan Actresses and chosen as the Golden Eagle Goddess in 2010.

In 2012, Wang starred in the period war drama Detachment of Women, which broke her previous typecasting as a "pure and innocent maiden". The same year, she starred in Chen Kaige's social film Caught in the Web wherein she played an ambitious journalist. Her performance won her the Best Supporting Actress award at the 29th Golden Rooster Awards.

Wang then took a break from acting and work due to her hectic schedules, heading to New York University to further her studies for three months.

After she returned from her hiatus in 2014, Wang starred as the titular protagonist Wei Zifu in her first historical drama The Virtuous Queen of Han. She also starred in the biographic film Rise of the Legend and road film The Continent, where she plays a prostitute that services guests at a road hotel. That year, she was chosen as the Most Valuable Chinese Actress.

In 2015, Wang starred in the cycling film To the Fore by Dante Lam. The same year, she starred in crime drama film The Dead End by Cao Baoping. The film drew critical acclaim and Wang won Best Supporting Actress at the 13th Changchun Film Festival.

In 2017, Wang starred in the medical drama ER Doctor, directed by Zheng Xiaolong.

In 2019, Wang returned to the big screen with the anthology film Half the Sky.

Filmography

Film

Television series

Discography

Awards and nominations

References

External links
 
 
 

Living people
People from Chifeng
21st-century Chinese actresses
Actresses from Inner Mongolia
Chinese film actresses
Chinese television actresses
Beijing Film Academy alumni
21st-century Chinese women singers
Year of birth missing (living people)